Monument Park High School is a public funded government school in Kraaifontein, Western Cape, South Africa

It opened its doors in 1989

Head Masters to follow
After Schreuder , Derek Swart took over until early 2008. When Jantjies,D.C. was in charged up to 2016, when the current head master Stevens,K. took over.

The first matrics

The class of 1992 was the first matric class, but the class of 1993 was the first class completing the entire curriculum (Grade 8 to 12) at the school.

Interschools

The very first interschools followed in 1991 against neighbor school Eben Dönges. Currently the school shares the field with Vredenburg High School and alternates locations annually.

Notable alumni
Eugene ButterworthTighthead Prop for Boland 
Jacques Engelbrecht Flanker for Boland

Other
Annually the music department part take in the Tygerberg International Eisteddfod. The choir  has been invited to perform in the UK in 2017.

The term Running With the Horses was introduced by the principal Mr D. C. Jantjies and became the slogan for leading the school.

The first Head Boy and Head Girl took office in 1992.

References 

Schools in the Western Cape